Springer is a German and English surname. Szprynger and Szpringer are Polonised forms. Špringer is the Slavonised form, used for example in the Czech Republic, Slovakia, Croatia, Serbia.

Notable people with the surname "Springer" include

A
Aaron Springer, American cartoonist
Anna Joy Springer, American author
Anton Heinrich Springer (1825–1891), German art historian
Ashley Springer, American actor
Axel Springer (1912–1985), German journalist

B
Ben Springer (1897–1960), Dutch draughts player
Bentley Springer (born 1979), Barbadian footballer
Brad Springer (1904–1970), American baseball player
Brian Springer (born 1959), American documentary filmmaker

C
Carl Springer (1910–1980), American speed skater
Carol Springer (1936–2019), American politician
Caspar Springer (born 1937), Barbadian sprinter
Charles E. Springer (1928–2019), American politician
Christian Springer (born 1971), German footballer
Christoph Springer (born 1985), German cyclist
Clement Springer, Saint Lucian musician
Cornelis Springer (1817–1891), Dutch painter
Curtis Howe Springer (1896–1985), American evangelist

D
Dennis Springer (born 1965), American baseball player
Dick Springer (born 1948), American lawyer and politician
Drew Springer (born 1966), American businessman and politician
Durand W. Springer (1866–1943), American football coach

E
Ed Springer (1867–1891), American baseball player
Eintou Pearl Springer (born 1944), Trinidadian poet

F
F. Springer (1932–2011), Dutch writer
Frank Springer (1929–2009), American cartoonist
Fred W. Springer (1859–1936), American politician
Friede Springer (born 1942), German publisher

G
Gadwin Springer (born 1993), French rugby league footballer
Gary Springer (born 1962), American basketball player
Geertruida H. Springer (1895–1988), Dutch painter
George Springer (mathematician) (1924–2019), American mathematician
George Springer (born 1989), American baseball player
Gerd Springer (1927–1999), Austrian footballer
Gregory Springer (born 1961), American rower

H
Hugh Springer (1913–1994), Barbadian politician
Hendy Springer (born 1964), Barbadian cricketer
Hermann Springer (1908–1978), Swiss footballer

I
Isidore Springer (1912–1942), Belgian diamond dealer

J
Jaden Springer (born 2002), American basketball player
James Springer, American politician
Jan Springer (1850–1915), Dutch architect
Jane Springer, American poet
Janet L. Springer, American dancer
Jean Springer (born 1939), Jamaican academic
Jerell Springer (born 1999), American basketball player
Jerry Springer (born 1944), American television presenter
Jim Springer (1926–2019), American basketball player
Joe Springer (1916–2004), American pianist
John Springer (disambiguation), multiple people
Jon Springer (born 1966), American filmmaker
Joy Springer, American politician
Julius Springer (1817–1877), German publisher
Justin Springer (born 1993), Kittitian footballer

K
Kara Springer, Canadian industrial designer
Khalid Springer (born 1982), Barbadian cricketer

L
Larry Springer (born 1947), American politician
Lewis Springer (1835–1895), Canadian politician
Linda M. Springer, American actuary

M
Macca Springer, New Zealand rugby union footballer
Mark Springer, British pianist
Max Springer (1877–1954), German organist
Melissa Springer, American photojournalist
Melle Springer (born 1998), Dutch footballer
Mike Springer (born 1965), American golfer
Moses Springer (1824–1898), Canadian businessman and politician
Mychal Springer, American rabbi

N
Nancy Springer (born 1948), American author
Nicholas Springer (1985–2021), American Paralympic rugby union footballer
Niko Springer (born 2000), German darts player

P
Paul J. Springer, American author
Philip Springer (born 1926), American composer

R
Raymond S. Springer (1882–1947), American politician
Rebecca Ruter Springer (1832–1904), American author
René Springer (born 1979), German politician
Reuben R. Springer (1800–1884), American businessman
Richard Springer (1951–2010), American activist
Rita Springer (born 1967), American musician
Robert Springer (disambiguation), multiple people
Roger Springer (born 1962), American musician
Rosemarie Springer (1920–2019), German equestrian
Russ Springer (born 1968), American baseball player

S
Shamar Springer (born 1997), Barbadian cricketer
Sharon Springer, American politician
Siegfried Springer (born 1943), Austrian pentathlete
Steve Springer (born 1961), American baseball player
Steven Springer (1951–2012), American guitarist
Stewart Springer (1906–1991), American zoologist

T
T. A. Springer (1926–2011), Dutch mathematician
Thomas Springer (born 1984), Austrian triathlete
Thomas J. Springer (born 1968), American politician
Timothy A. Springer, American immunologist
Tony Springer, Canadian guitarist

W
William Springer (disambiguation), multiple people

V
Victor G. Springer (born 1928), American zoologist

Y
Yakov Springer (1921–1972), Polish-Israeli wrestler

Z
Zola Springer (born 1972), American soccer player

See also
Justice Springer (disambiguation), a disambiguation page for Justices surnamed "Springer"

German-language surnames
Jewish surnames